"Winding Road" is a first collaboration single between Ayaka and duo Kobukuro.

Information
This single was used in Japanese commercials to promote the Nissan Cube. The commercial made its first television airing on March 1, 2007. The single was sold for ¥555 or roughly $4.50, an unusually low price for a physical single, although this price may be attributed to the single containing only 2 tracks as most singles contain 4. In its first week, the single placed 2nd on the Oricon weekly singles listing.

Track listing

Charts

Sales and certifications

References

External links
Oricon Profile

2007 singles
Ayaka songs
Songs written by Ayaka
2007 songs